The Central District of Varamin County is in Tehran province, Iran. At the National Census in 2006, its population was 232,393 in 59,390 households. The following census in 2011 counted 271,738 people in 70,715 households. At the latest census in 2016, the district had 258,752 inhabitants in 78,063 households.

References 

Varamin County

Districts of Tehran Province

Populated places in Tehran Province

Populated places in Varamin County